Vulture was built in France 1777 and captured. By early 1779 she was sailing as a privateer out of Liverpool. She then became a slave ship in the triangular trade in enslaved people. She made 10 voyages as slaver and was captured in 1795 on her 11th such voyage.

Career
Vulture was captured in 1778 from the French, condemned in the High Court of Admiralty on 2 December 1778, and made free at Liverpool on 15 January 1779. She first appeared in Lloyd's Register (LR) in 1779 with Allanson, master, William Boats, owner, and trade Liverpool privateer.  On 27 April 1779, Vulture, Allanson, master, captured St Cyprian, of 400 tons (bm), which was sailing from Martinique to Bordeaux. Then in August Vulture captured the Spanish snow San Esteven, which was sailing from Orinoco to Cadiz. San Esteven was carrying 1400 rolls of the "Genuine and Fine Oronoque Vorcena or Cannastre Tobacco, 23 tons of cocoa, 400 hides, 370 dollars, and some chest of medicine."

On 31 January 1783 Vulture, Captain Allanson, came into Kinsale. A storm had carried away her main and mizzen masts. On 14 February she sailed for Liverpool to effect repairs and on the 14th she put into Liverpool, having sustained "some Damage."

1st enslaving voyage (1781–1782): Captain John Savage sailed from Liverpool on 1 June 1781. Vulture gathered her captives at Bonny and arrived at Kingston, Jamaica, on 1 December with 525 captives  She left on 14 February 1782 and arrived back at Liverpool on 4 April. She had left with 50 crew members and suffered eight crew deaths on the voyage. Vulture had sailed home in company with Jane, Hewan, master. On their way they captured two Spanish vessels sailing from Havana to Omoa. One vessel, a snow with 3100 dollars, sail cloth, etc., the  British sent for Liverpool. The second was a gunboat that her captors turned over to their prisoners. The snow foundered off the coast of Ireland.

Vulture made a trading voyage to St Lucia and Tortola between 7 November 1782 and 3 July 1783. She brought back sugar, fustic, coffee, cotton, and rum.

2nd enslaving voyage (1783–1784): Captain William Wilson sailed from Liverpool on 26 July 1783, bound for Bonny. Vulture arrived at Kingston on 4 March 1784 with 592 captives. She left on 7 April, and arrived back at Liverpool on 25 May. She had left Liverpool with 53 crew members and suffered 19 crew deaths on her voyage.

3rd enslaving voyage (1784–1785): Captain Wilson sailed from Liverpool on 9 July 1784. She gathered her captives at Bonny and delivered 698 to Kingston on 11 December 1784. She sailed from Kingston on 5 March 1785 and arrived back at Liverpool on 20 April. She had left Liverpool with 50 crew members and suffered 13 crew deaths on the voyage.

4th enslaving voyage (1785–1786): Captain James Brown sailed from Liverpool on 25 June 1785. Vulture gathered her captives at Bonny and delivered 570 to Dominica. She arrived back at Liverpool on 15 April 1786. She had left Liverpool with 44 crew members and suffered five crew deaths on the voyage.

5th enslaving voyage (1786–1787): Captain Brown sailed from Liverpool on 5 June 1786. Vulture gathered captives first and Bonny and then at New Calabar. She sailed to Kingston, stopping first at São Tomé. She arrived at Kingston on 27 January 1787. She arrived with 646 captives, and landed 589. She sailed for Liverpool on 3 April and arrived home on 5 June. She had left with 49 crewmembers and suffered 16 crew deaths on her voyage.

It was on this voyage, on 16 September 1786, that a seaman died of his injuries after having been "barbarously beaten". Although he did not name Vulture or Brown by name, the abolitionist Thomas Clarkson mentioned the instance in his history of the abolition of the trade.

6th enslaving voyage (1788–1789): Captain Brown sailed from Liverpool on 12 May 1788. Vulture gathered captives at Bonny and delivered 602 captives to Montego Bay on 31 December 1788. She arrived back at Liverpool on 18 May 1789. She had left Liverpool with 52 crewmembers and she had suffered six crew deaths on the voyage.

The passage in 1788 of Dolben's Act (Slave Trade Act 1788) reduced the number of captives that Vulture would gather on subsequent voyages.

7th enslaving voyage (1789–1790): Captain Brown sailed from Liverpool on 12 June 1789. Vulture again gathered her captives at Bonny and delivered them to Montego Bay. She had embarked 448 captives and she delivered 444 on 1 December. She arrived back at Liverpool on 20 May 1790. She had left Liverpool with 43 crew members and she suffered no crew deaths on her voyage.

8th enslaving voyage (1790–1791): Captain Samuel Clough sailed from Liverpool on 16 October 1790. Vulture gathered her captives at Bonny and delivered them to Montego Bay. She arrived on 15 May 1791 and landed 436. There apparently there was an insurrection aboard her by her captives, either before or during the voyage, but details are lacking.

Vulture arrived back at Liverpool on 1 August. She had left with 50 crew members and suffered seven crew deaths on her voyage.

9th enslaving voyage (1791–1792): Captain Clough sailed from Liverpool on 10 September 1791 and began trading in Africa on 27 November. Vulture gathered her captives at Bonny. She left Africa on 5 March 1792 and arrived at Montego Bay on 10 May. She landed 444 captives, the same number as she had embarked. She arrived back at Liverpool on 16 July. She had left Liverpool with 39 crew members, and she suffered four crew deaths on her voyage.

After the passage of Dolben's Act, masters received a bonus of £100 for a mortality rate of under 2%; the ship's surgeon received £50. For a mortality rate between two and three percent, the bonus was halved. There was no bonus if mortality exceeded 3%. 

10th enslaving voyage (1792–1793): Captain James Bachope sailed from Liverpool on 6 October 1792. Vulture gathered her captives at Bonny and arrived at Kingston on 18 June 1793. There she landed 465 captives. She left on 21 August and arrived back at Liverpool on 8 October. She had left Liverpool with 40 crew members and she suffered seven crew deaths on the voyage.

War with France began while Captain James Baychop was still in the middle of the voyage. Still he was issued or acquired a letter of marque on 11 April 1793. The size of the crew and the armament suggests that Vultures owners acquired the letter of marque, as an option to engage in privateering when she returned.

Vulture may have sailed on a privateering cruise, but there is no record of such a voyage in Lloyd's List, or in British newspapers available online.

Fate
Captain James Bachope sailed from Liverpool on 23 August 1794 on a voyage to acquire captives. Lloyd's List reported on 12 May 1795 that a French squadron had captured Vulture, Backop, master, [James] Brown, master, and Eliza, [Samuel] Clough, master, in the Bonny River. The capture occurred between 22 and 29 December 1794. Vulture had not embarked any captives before the French captured her.

In 1794, 25 British slave ships were lost. Three were lost on the African coast. During the period 1793 to 1807, war, rather than maritime hazards nor slave resistance, was the greatest cause of vessel losses among British slave vessels.

Notes

Citations

References
  
 
 
 
 
 
 
 

1777 ships
Ships built in France
Captured ships
Age of Sail merchant ships of England
Privateer ships of the United Kingdom
Liverpool slave ships